Tommy Douglas Dean (born August 30, 1945 in Iuka, Mississippi) is an American former professional baseball player. A shortstop, his career extended from 1964–71 and included 215 games played in Major League Baseball over four seasons (1967; 1969–71).

Career
Dean was signed out of Iuka (MS) High School for a $60,000 bonus in 1964 as an undrafted free agent by Los Angeles Dodgers general manager Buzzie Bavasi, who was trying to transform the Dodgers into a team built around pitching, speed and defense and considered Dean a top young prospect. However, Dean only appeared in 12 games with the Dodgers during the  season. After spending 1968 in the minors, Dean was acquired by Bavasi's new expansion team, the San Diego Padres, nine days into the Padres'  maiden season. He was the Padres' most-used shortstop that year, starting in 81 of the club's 162 games.

Dean spent three seasons with the Padres, playing his last game in 1971. All told, he batted only .180 in 529 big-league at bats. His 95 hits included 15 doubles, three triples and four home runs.

References

External links

1945 births
Living people
Albuquerque Dodgers players
Arizona Instructional League Dodgers players
Baseball players from Mississippi
Los Angeles Dodgers players
Major League Baseball shortstops
St. Petersburg Saints players
San Diego Padres players
Spokane Indians players
People from Iuka, Mississippi